State Road 368 (NM 368) is a  state highway in the US state of New Mexico. NM 368's southern terminus is at U.S. Route 70 (US 70) and US 380 in Tinnie, and the northern terminus is at the end of state maintenance in Arabela.

Major intersections

See also

References

368
Transportation in Lincoln County, New Mexico